Pier Paolo Petroni (born 30 March 1987) is an Italian modern pentathlete. He competed at the 2016 Summer Olympics in Rio de Janeiro, in the men's event.

References

External links

1987 births
Living people
Italian male modern pentathletes
Olympic modern pentathletes of Italy
Modern pentathletes at the 2016 Summer Olympics
Modern pentathletes of Centro Sportivo Carabinieri
21st-century Italian people